WCW Mayhem: The Music is an album of songs related to World Championship Wrestling during the late 1990s.

While many of the songs were performed by professional musicians, others featured wrestlers on vocals, such as "Bow Wow Wow." Numerous tracks, such as "Got Him In The Corner" and "Count That Man Out," were simply short recordings of classic match spots from WCW broadcasting. Included inside the WCW Mayhem CD case was a decal.

Track listing

References

Professional wrestling albums
World Championship Wrestling
1999 compilation albums
Rock compilation albums
Hip hop compilation albums
Dance music compilation albums
Heavy metal compilation albums
1999 soundtrack albums